Clasper v Lawrence [1990] 3 NZLR 231 is a cited case in New Zealand regarding the quantification of damages for breach of contract.

References

New Zealand contract case law
1990 in New Zealand law